= Yelaur =

Yelaur (Russian: Елаур) may refer to:

- Yelaur, Republic of Tatarstan, a village (selo) in the Republic of Tatarstan, Russia
- Yelaur, Ulyanovsk Oblast, a village (selo) in Ulyanovsk Oblast, Russia
